Bashār ibn Burd (714–783), nicknamed al-Mura'ath, meaning "the wattled", was a Persian poet of the late Umayyad and early Abbasid periods who wrote in Arabic. Bashar was of Persian ethnicity; his grandfather was taken as a captive to Iraq, but his father was a freedman (mawla) of the Uqayl tribe. Some Arab scholars considered Bashar the first "modern" poet, and one of the pioneers of badi' in Arabic literature. It is believed that the poet exerted a great influence on the subsequent generation of poets.

Life
Bashar was born into a family of Persian stock. He was blind from birth and said to have been ugly, in part a result of smallpox scarring on his face. He grew up in the rich cultural environment of Basra and showed his poetic talents at an early age. Bashar fell foul of some religious figures, such as Malik ibn Dinar and al-Hasan al-Basri, who condemned his poetry for its licentiousness. He exchanged Hija with several poets. Being anti-Mu'tazili, he criticized Wasil ibn Ata, who by some accounts is considered the founder of the Mutazilite school of Islamic thought.

After the Abbasids built Baghdad, Bashar moved there from Basra in 762. Bashar became associated with the caliph al-Mahdi. Due to his libertinism, al-Mahdi ordered him not to write further love poetry. Bashar quickly violated the ban.

Death
Multiple stories of Bashar's end exist. Ammiel Alcalay in 1993 argued that Bashar was condemned as a heretic and executed by al-Mahdi in 783. Hugh Kennedy, on the other hand, relates al-Tabari's account that Ya'qub ibn Dawud had Bashar murdered in the marshes between Basra and Baghdad.

Style
Most of his Hija' (satires) are in traditional style, while his fakhr expresses his Shu'ubi sentiments, vaunting the achievements of his Persian ancestors and denigrating the "uncivilized Arabs". The following couplet from Bashar demonstrates his admiration for Zoroastrianism (the religion of his Persian ancestors) over Islam by preferring prostration (sajdah) towards fire (Shaitan like other jinn was created from smokeless fire) in lieu of soil (Adam's origin).

الارض مظلمة و النار مشرقة
والنار معبودة مذكانت النار

See also

Arabic literature
Ibn Gharsiya - Shu'ubi poet.

References

Sources cited
 
 

714 births
783 deaths
Poets from the Abbasid Caliphate
Poets from the Umayyad Caliphate
8th-century Iranian people
8th-century writers
Executed Iranian people
People executed for heresy
8th-century executions by the Abbasid Caliphate
Former Muslim critics of Islam
Critics of Sunni Islam
Iranian blind people
Shu'ubiyya
Romantic poets
8th-century Arabic poets
8th-century people from the Abbasid Caliphate
Persian Arabic-language poets